At Crystal Palace is the second studio album by the band Erase Errata, released in 2003.

Track listing
"Driving Test – 1:39
"Ca. Viewing" – 2:53
"Go to Sleep" – 1:56
"Retreat! The Most Familiar" – 2:25
"Surprise, It's Easter" – 1:33
"Let's Be Active C/O Club Hott" – 2:52
"Flippy Flop" – :56
"Owls" – 2:20
"Ease on Over" – 1:52
"The White Horse Is Bucking" – 1:20
"A Thief Detests the Criminal, Elements of the Ruling Class" – 2:11
"Harvester" – 1:22
"Matter No Medley" – 4:07

Personnel
Jenny Hoyston - Vocals, Trumpet
Ellie Erickson - Bass
Bianca Sparta - Drums
Sara Jaffe - Guitar
Maya - Recorder

References

2003 albums
Erase Errata albums
Queercore albums
Blast First albums
Avant-pop albums